Janghai is a market and Gram Panchayat in the district of Prayagraj, in the Indian state of Uttar Pradesh. It is located 226 km kilometres southeast of the state capital, Lucknow, and 24 kilometres from Handia Tehsil. As of 2022, Janghai's population was about 25,000. 

Janghai crosses two districts, which complicates its development. Many local leaders want Janghai to become a Nagar Panchayat.

Climate 
Janghai has a humid subtropical climate that is common to cities in north-central India. Janghai experiences three seasons: a hot, dry summer; a cool, dry winter; and a warm, humid monsoon season.

The monsoon season begins in early July and lasts until September. The winter season spans December through February. Temperatures rarely drop to the freezing mark, so it does not snow. Janghai also experiences heavy fog in January, resulting in traffic and travel delays.

Transport

Rail 

Janghai has an A category railway station at a junction under the Lucknow division of the Northern Railway zone of Indian Railways. It is well connected to all major cities of India. Janghai is home to the largest railway station in Prayagraj District, with 5 platforms and parking. 

Rail connects Janghai to Zafarabad and Jaunpur to the north; Phaphamau, Prayagraj to the south, Varanasi to the east, and Partapgarh to the west.

Major trains 
Ratnagiri Superfast Express
Kamayani Express
Godaan Express
Kashi Vishwanath Express
Poorva Express
Bundelkhand Express
Sarnath Express

Road 
Buses and jeeps are the main transport. The Janghai Bus Depot is located to the opposite of the Janghai Railway Station. Janghai is connected to Lucknow, Varanasi, Allahabad and other cities, such as Azamgarh, Mirzapur, Bhadohi, Sultanpur, and Ghazipur. 

One of the main routes is Janghai to Handia, a  road; in-between stops are Janghai bazaar, Bypass, Chuka Mode, Champapur, Chanethu, Annuwa, Belkha, Vrindavan, Vari, Madwa, Sirsa, Katahara, Ciady, Handia.

Janghai connects with NH31 via Machhalishahar. Janghai Barna road also connects Janghai to Prayagraj via Phoolpur, Sahson, and Andawa. PDA buses connect Janghai to Prayagraj via Vari and Prtappur.

Air 

Lal Bahadur Shastri Airport is 56 km away.  Prayagraj Bamrauli Airport is approximately 60 km away. Domestic and international flights are accessible.

References 

Villages in Allahabad district